Cheryl Chase (born February 5, 1953) is a former member of the Arizona House of Representatives from January 2001 until January 2007. She was first elected to the House in November 2000, representing District 7. After redistricting in 2002, Chase was reelected in both 2002, now representing District 23, and 2004. Chase did not run for re-election to the House in 2006, instead choosing to run for the Arizona State Senate. She lost in the general election to Rebecca Rios.

References

Women state legislators in Arizona
Republican Party members of the Arizona House of Representatives
1953 births
Living people
Politicians from Phoenix, Arizona
21st-century American women